Alpine skiing at the 1997 Winter Universiade was held at the Muju Resort in Muju, South Korea from January 26 to February 2, 1997.

Men's events

Women's events

Medal table

References

Links 
 

1997 Winter Universiade
1997